Skatt Bros. Rico And The Ravens was the Skatt Brothers' second and final album that was only released in Australia, supported by the single "Oh, Those Girls" (Mercury/PolyGram 6180 039) backed with "Heat Of Passion".

Track listing
"Runaway" (Martin-Ross)
"Kiss Rock 'N' Roll Goodbye" (Sweval)
"Oh, Those Girls" (Andez, Sweval)
"Rain" (Delaney, Richard Martin-Ross)
"If It's Alright" (Fontana)
"Heat Of Passion" (Sweval, Andez, Fontana, Delaney)
"Eternity" (Delaney)
"L.A. Sunshine" (Fontana, Andez, Sweval)
"Wait Till Tonight" (Delaney)

Personnel
 Richard Martin-Ross - Guitars/Vocals
 Pieter Sweval - Bass Guitar/Vocals, Acoustic Rhythm Guitar on "Kiss Rock 'N' Roll Goodbye" and "Eternity"
 Sean Delaney - Keyboards/Vocals, Percussion on "L.A. Sunshine"
 Danny Brant - Lead Guitar
 Richie Fontana - Drums, Rhythm Guitar on "If It's Alright" and "L.A. Sunshine"

Recording
 Produced by Ian Guenther and Willi Morrison
 Arranged by The Skatt Bros.
 Recorded at Amber Studios, Toronto, Canada by George Semkiw
 Assisted by Ed Stone, Rick Muszynski
 Mixed by Sean Delaney and Bruce Brown at Albert Studios, Sydney, Australia
 Mastered by Richard Mott at EMI, Sydney, Australia
 Cover photography by Bob Jenkins

References

1981 albums